Def2shoot  is a motion picture and advertising visual effects company, founded in 2002 and established in Paris, France. The firm has gained popularity in the French visual effects and CGI industry.

On June 28, 2007, it was placed in receivership. On April 18, 2008, it was the subject of a disposal plan and was delisted on September 24, 2015.

In 2008 the assets were taken over by Hiventy le Hub.

Filmography 

 Paris (Cédric Klapisch, 2008)
 L'Ennemi intime (Florent Emilio Siri, 2007)
 La Môme (Olivier Dahan, 2007)
 Incontrôlable (Raffy Shart, 2006)
 OSS 117: Cairo, Nest of Spies (Michel Hazanavicius, 2006)
 Un ticket pour l'espace (Eric Lartigau, 2006)
 The Russian Dolls (Cédric Klapisch, 2005)
 L'Empire des loups (Chris Nahon, 2005)
 Les 11 commandements (Michaël Youn, 2004)
 Saint Ange (Pascal Laugier, 2003)
 Monsieur N (Antoine de Caunes, 2003)

Animation 

 Yona Yona Penguin (Rintaro, 2009)
 Peur(s) du Noir (2007)
 Gullia (2006–2007)
 Gecko (2006)
 LightFields (2006)
 Bravo Gudule (2004–2006)

Advertising

 Belvedere (2007)
 Pods (2007)
 Perrier (2006)
 Palmolive (2006)
 Smirnoff (2006)
 Kia (2006)
 Halifax (2006)
 Air France (2006)
 Molson (2006)
 Sony-Ericsson (2005)
 PlayStation (2005)

External links and sources 
 Official Def2shoot website

References

Film production companies of France
Mass media in Paris
2002 establishments in France